Golungo Alto  is a town and municipality in Cuanza Norte Province in Angola. The municipality had a population of 33,834 in 2014.

The writer Rosária da Silva was born in Golungo Alto in 1959.

References

Populated places in Cuanza Norte Province
Municipalities of Angola